The Royal Institute of Art is an institution in Stockholm, Sweden for higher education in art, founded in 1735. The school was part of the Royal Swedish Academy of Arts, until 1978 when it was made independent. It is under the supervision of the Ministry of Education and Research.

See also
Konstfack
Valand School of Fine Arts
Academy of Fine Arts, Umeå

References

External links
Royal Institute of Art

University colleges in Sweden
Art schools in Sweden
Higher education in Stockholm
Culture in Stockholm